Leonardo Leyva Martínez (born March 23, 1990) is a Cuban male volleyball player. He was part of the Cuba men's national volleyball team. He has played professionally in Cuba, Puerto Rico, Russia, Qatar, South Korea, Turkey, China and the United Arab Emirates.

He currently plays for Ansan OKman.

Sporting achievements

Clubs

Liga de Voleibol Superior Masculino
  2011/2012 - with Cariduros de Fajardo

V-League
  2012/2013 - with Daejeon Samsung Bluefangs
  2013/2014 - with Daejeon Samsung Bluefangs

Individually
 2011 Liga de Voleibol Superior Masculino - Most Valuable Player
 2012 V-League - Most Valuable Player
 2012 V-League - Best Spiker
 2012 V-League - Best Scorer
 2013 V-League - Most Valuable Player
 2013 V-League - Best Spiker
 2013 V-League - Best Scorer
 2014 V-League - Most Valuable Player
 2014 V-League - Best Receiver

Record
Leonardo Leyva established a new world record in scoring for a four-set match. Leyva undisputed leader of the Samsung Blue Fangs club, scored 53 points against Korean Air Jumbo.

References

External links
 profile at FIVB.org

1990 births
Living people
Cuban men's volleyball players
Place of birth missing (living people)
Daejeon Samsung Bluefangs players
Defecting sportspeople of Cuba
21st-century Cuban people